Ashen Silva (born 12 July 1990) is a Sri Lankan cricketer. He has played in more than 80 first-class matches since 2011.

References

External links
 

1990 births
Living people
Sri Lankan cricketers
Cricketers from Colombo